Christopher Robert Mochrie (born 7 April 2003) is a Scottish footballer who plays as an attacking midfielder for Dunfermline Athletic, on loan from Dundee United. He holds the record as the youngest player to appear for the Dundee United first team after making his debut in 2019.

Playing career

Club
Born in Dundee, Mochrie played for Logie Harp Boys Club before joining the Dundee United Academy. He also attended the Scottish Football Association Performance School programme based at St John's Roman Catholic High School. He became Dundee United's youngest ever first team player when making his debut as a substitute against Greenock Morton in May 2019, aged 16 years and 27 days.

In October 2020, Mochrie joined Scottish League One side Montrose on loan. He was recalled by United when lower league football was suspended in January 2021, but returned to Montrose when the suspension was lifted in March.

Mochrie scored his first goal for Dundee United on 14 July 2021, in a 6–1 win over Elgin City in the Scottish League Cup. He made his Scottish Premiership debut and first league start against Heart of Midlothian the following month.

In August 2022 Mochrie joined League One side Dunfermline Athletic on a season long loan.

International
Mochrie was called up to the Scotland under-16 squad in August 2018. He scored Scotland's goal in a 1–1 draw against Northern Ireland in the Victory Shield in November 2018. After being involved in a training camp in August 2019, he made a scoring debut for Scotland under-17s in a 2–0 win against Armenia in October 2019. He was called up to the under-21 squad for the first time in August 2021.

Career statistics

Notes

References

External links

2003 births
Living people
Footballers from Dundee
Scottish footballers
Scotland youth international footballers
Association football midfielders
Dundee United F.C. players
Montrose F.C. players
Scottish Professional Football League players
Dunfermline Athletic F.C. players
Scotland under-21 international footballers